Samandar may refer to:

 Samandar (city), a city in Khazaria on the western edge of the Caspian Sea, south of Atil and north of the Caucasus
 Samandar, Iran, a village in Razavi Khorasan Province, Iran
 Samandar, Afghanistan, a settlement in Maidan Wardak Province, Afghanistan (34, 21, 0,N, 68, 35, 0,E)
 Kázim-i-Samandar, one of the Apostles of Bahá'u'lláh, and a prominent teacher of the Bahá'í Faith, known as Samandar
 Samandar (TV series), a 1995–1996 Indian television series about Indian naval personnel that aired on Doordarshan